{{Taxobox
| regnum = Animalia
| phylum = Arthropoda
| classis = Chilopoda
| ordo = Scolopendromorpha
| familia = Scolopendridae
| genus = Cormocephalus
| species = C. coynei| binomial = Cormocephalus coynei| binomial_authority = L. E. Koch, 1984
}}Cormocephalus coynei is a species of centipede found on the uninhabited Phillip and Nepean islands to the south of Norfolk Island. It is also known as the Phillip Island centipede'''.
The species was observed on Phillip Island in 1792, but was not formally described until 1984. It can grow up to 23.5 cm, and is reddish brown and orange in colour.  The Phillip Island centipede is known for its habit of preying on vertebrates including geckos, skinks, black-winged petrel nestlings and fish, as well as other small arthropods.

References

coynei
Centipedes of Australia
Animals described in 1984
Endemic fauna of Australia
Fauna of Norfolk Island